Nenad Čanak (born April 24, 1976) is a Serbian professional basketball coach and former player who currently serves as the head coach for Lietkabelis Panevėžys of the Lithuanian Basketball League.

Professional career
Čanak started his career in Partizan making his debut in the 1993–94 season. After that in the period between 1995–1999 Čanak was in the lines of the Serbian club Spartak Subotica. Then he came back again to wear the jersey of Partizan until 2003, demonstrating very good skills and participating in three tournaments – the YUBA League, the Adriatic League and the Euroleague. In 2002 he made a double-double, winning both the national championship and the Cup of FR Yugoslavia.

The career of the forward continued in NIS Vojvodina (2003–2004) and in the Greek Makedonikos (2004–2005). He has registered participation in all club tournaments in Europe – FIBA Europe League with Vojvodina, and ULEB Cup with Makedonikos and Alba Berlin.

In the summer of 2005, Čanak signed a contract with ALBA Berlin. During his first season in Germany he scored an average of 9,3 points, 3,2 rebounds and 1,3 assists in 43 games of the Bundesliga and an average of 8,3 points, 4,1 rebounds in 10 games in the ULEB Cup competition. In April 2007, Čanak suffered an injury and had been recovering in the next two months. In the 2006–07 season he took part in 11 games of ULEB and made an average of 5,6 points and 2,0 rebounds per game, while in the Bundesliga he had 33 games with 4,8 points per game. While wearing the jersey of Alba Berlin, he won the German Cup in 2006.

In the 2007–08 season he played with Bulgarian club Lukoil Academic. Čanak helped Lukoil to reach the ULEB Cup Last 16 and record an unprecedented undefeated domestic season, sweeping through the Bulgarian Cup, regular season and playoffs for a 44-0 record. Čanak averaged 8.1 points and 3.8 rebounds off the bench in 10 ULEB Cup appearances and 12.4 points and 4 rebounds per game in the Bulgarian League.

In 2009, he played in Ukraine with Khimik and Gryfony Symferopil. In the 2009–10 season he had a short stint with Tamiš before he moved to the Hungarian team PVSK Panthers. In the 2010–11 season he played in Cyprus with AEK Larnaca and his last team was Železničar Inđija in 2011–12.

Coaching career
From 2012 to 2016, Čanak worked as an assistant coach of Dejan Milojević in Mega Basket. In the 2016–17 season he served as an assistant coach of Aleksandar Džikić in Partizan, and actually made his debut as a head coach in Džikic's absence, including leading the team to the 2017 Serbian Cup final.

His first job as a head coach was in Spartak Subotica in the 2017–18 season. On December 14, 2017, Čanak was named as the head coach of Partizan. He resigned as the head coach of Partizan in October 2018.

On November 1, 2018, Čanak became the head coach for Lietkabelis Panevėžys of the Lithuanian League.

See also 
 List of Radivoj Korać Cup-winning head coaches

References

External links
 Nenad Čanak at euroleague.com
 Nenad Čanak at eurobasket.com
 Nenad Čanak at eurocupbasketball.com (coach)

1976 births
Living people
AEK Larnaca B.C. players
Alba Berlin players
Basketball players from Zagreb
BC Khimik players
BC Lietkabelis coaches
Croatian expatriate basketball people in Serbia
KK Partizan coaches
KK Partizan players
KK Vojvodina Srbijagas players
KK Spartak Subotica players
KK Tamiš players
KK Spartak Subotica coaches
KK Železničar Inđija players
Makedonikos B.C. players
OKK Kikinda players
PBC Academic players
Power forwards (basketball)
Serbian men's basketball players
Serbian expatriate basketball people in Bulgaria
Serbian expatriate basketball people in Cyprus
Serbian expatriate basketball people in Greece
Serbian expatriate basketball people in Germany
Serbian expatriate basketball people in Lithuania
Serbian expatriate basketball people in Hungary
Serbian expatriate basketball people in Ukraine
Serbs of Croatia
Yugoslav Wars refugees